Tavon Antonio Young (born March 14, 1994) is an American football cornerback who is a free agent. He played college football at Temple. He was originally drafted in the fourth round of the 2016 NFL draft by the Baltimore Ravens.

Early years
Young attended Frederick Douglass High School from 2008 to 2011 and Potomac High School from 2011 to 2012 in Oxon Hill, Maryland, where he was teammates with cornerback Ronald Darby.

Professional career
On November 17, 2015, it was announced that Young accepted his invitation to play in the 2016 Senior Bowl.

His home state Baltimore Ravens selected Young in the fourth round (104th overall) of the 2016 NFL Draft. Young was the 16th cornerback drafted in 2016.

Baltimore Ravens

2016 season
On May 9, 2016, the Baltimore Ravens signed Young to a four-year, $2.94 million contract that includes a signing bonus of $605,130.

Young recorded his first career interception in Week 3 of the 2016 season in a 19–17 win vs. the Jacksonville Jaguars. He made his first NFL start in Week 6 against the New York Giants, recording three tackles and snagging his second interception of the season, picking off Eli Manning. He became the Ravens' No. 2 cornerback behind Jimmy Smith, playing in 16 games with 11 starts recording 53 tackles, eight passes defensed and two interceptions.

2017 season
On June 1, 2017, Young suffered a torn ACL during OTAs, and missed the entire 2017 season. He was placed on injured reserve on September 1, 2017.

2018 season
Young entered the 2018 season as the Ravens No. 3 cornerback behind Brandon Carr and Marlon Humphrey. Young recorded his first two sacks of his career in the season opener against the Buffalo Bills, becoming the first Ravens defensive back to do so since Bennie Thompson in 1996. He recorded his third-career interception in Week 5 against the Cleveland Browns. In Week 13, Young returned a fumble forced by Patrick Onwuasor and returned it 12 yards for the touchdown in a 26–16 win over the Atlanta Falcons. In Week 16, Young returned another fumble forced by Patrick Onwuasor and returned it 62 yards for the touchdown in a 22–10 win over the Los Angeles Chargers. He played in 15 games with six starts, recording 37 combined tackles, five pass deflections, an interception, three fumble recoveries and two defensive touchdowns.

2019 season
On February 21, 2019, Young signed a three-year, $25.8 million contract extension with the Ravens, making him the highest-paid nickel cornerback in the NFL. On August 15, 2019, head coach John Harbaugh announced that Young was expected to miss the entire 2019 NFL season due to a neck injury he suffered in practice. He was placed on season-ending injured reserve on August 31, 2019.

2020 season
Young appeared in the Ravens' season opener against the Cleveland Browns, recording two solo tackles. During the first quarter of the Ravens' Week 2 matchup on September 20, 2020, against the Houston Texans, Young forced an incomplete pass, but suffered a torn ACL on the play and the team placed him on injured reserve following the game on September 28. He was placed on the reserve/COVID-19 list by the Ravens on November 28, 2020, and moved back to injured reserve three days later.

2021 season
Young would see slightly more playing time in 2021 due in part to a season-ending ACL injury to fellow corner Marcus Peters. In Week 2 against the Kansas City Chiefs, he had a crucial interception off Patrick Mahomes in the 3rd quarter to help spark a rally as the Ravens won 36–35. He also broke up a pass during the game.

Young was released on March 9, 2022, after six seasons.

Chicago Bears
On April 11, 2022, the Chicago Bears signed Young to a one-year contract. He was placed on injured reserve on August 30, 2022. He was released on September 17.

References

External links
Temple Owls bio

1994 births
Living people
American football cornerbacks
Baltimore Ravens players
Chicago Bears players
People from Oxon Hill, Maryland
Players of American football from Maryland
Sportspeople from the Washington metropolitan area
Temple Owls football players
Ed Block Courage Award recipients